Shishupal Natthu Patle (born 1 February 1967) is a member of the 14th Lok Sabha of India. He represents the Bhandara constituency of Maharashtra and is a member of the Bharatiya Janata Party (BJP) political party.

External links
 Official biographical sketch in Parliament of India website

Living people
1967 births
Bharatiya Janata Party politicians from Maharashtra
People from Maharashtra
India MPs 2004–2009
People from Bhandara
Lok Sabha members from Maharashtra
Marathi politicians